Maine Mariners may refer to:

 Maine Mariners (AHL), an ice hockey team in Portland, Maine, which operated from 1977 to 1992
 Maine Mariners (ECHL), an ice hockey team in Portland, Maine, which has operated since 2018